Moja (Swahili: "one") was a chimpanzee at the Chimpanzee and Human Communication Institute. She was born at the Laboratory for Experimental Medicine and Surgery in Primates (LEMSIP). In infanthood Moja was treated in a similar way to a child, and immersed in an environment of American Sign Language.

While engaging in play activities, she was observed changing her appearance while in the presence of a mirror using clothing, masks and make-up.  She was observed also to place sunglasses upon her head, look into a mirror and make the sign-language sign for "glasses" on one occasion, also using the mirror for the application of lip-gloss and  a crayon for the same purpose.

Moja is known as "the first ape to paint figurative works." For example, she drew a circle, colored it in orange, and signed cherry.

See also
 List of individual apes

References

Individual chimpanzees